Bodhiruci was a Buddhist monk from North India (6th century CE) active in the area of Luoyang, China. His 39 translated works include the Ten Stages Sutra and commentary, and the Amitabha Sutra with commentary. Bodhiruci is regarded as the patriarch of the Dashabhumika school, which used his Ten Stages Sutra as its chief object of study. This Bodhiruci should not be confused with 8th century Bodhiruchi who translated Mahāratnakūṭa Sūtra.

References

6th-century Indian philosophers
Indian expatriates in China
Indian Buddhist monks
Indian Buddhists
Northern Wei Buddhist monks
Indian Buddhist missionaries
Translators to Chinese
6th-century Indian writers
Missionary linguists